Roots & Herbs is a jazz album by Art Blakey & the Jazz Messengers, recorded in 1961  at the same sessions which produced The Freedom Rider, but not released on the Blue Note label until 1970. The CD reissue features three alternate takes, two of which originally released in 1979 on Pisces.

Track listing
All compositions by Wayne Shorter.

"Ping Pong" – 7:06
"Roots and Herbs" – 6:05
"The Back Sliders" – 7:51
"United" – 7:29
"Look at the Birdie" – 6:45
"Master Mind" – 6:55

Bonus tracks on CD reissue:
"The Back Sliders" (Alternate Take) - 6:57
"Ping Pong" (Alternate Version) - 5:58
"United" (Alternate Version) - 6:48

Personnel
 Art Blakey — drums
 Lee Morgan — trumpet
 Wayne Shorter — tenor saxophone
 Bobby Timmons (#1, 3, 5-9), Walter Davis, Jr. (#2, 4) — piano
 Jymie Merritt — double bass

References

1970 albums
Art Blakey albums
The Jazz Messengers albums
Blue Note Records albums
Albums produced by Alfred Lion